Superheat may refer to:

Superheating, in physics
Superheater, for steam engine superheat
Superheat (album), live 2000 album by Dutch band The Gathering